Daniel João Alves Faria (born 29 March 1987 in Braga) is a Portuguese former footballer who played as a right back or a central defender.

References

External links

1987 births
Living people
Sportspeople from Braga
Portuguese footballers
Association football defenders
Primeira Liga players
Liga Portugal 2 players
Segunda Divisão players
Gil Vicente F.C. players